Henry Fane may refer to:

Henry Fane (died 1580), member of parliament (MP) for Winchelsea
Henry Fane (died 1596), MP for Hythe
Sir Henry Fane (died 1706) (c. 1650–1706), MP for Reading
Henry Fane of Brympton (1669–1726), English merchant
Henry Fane of Wormsley (1703–1777), British politician, MP for Lyme Regis
Henry Fane (1739–1802), British politician, MP for Lyme Regis
Henry Hamlyn-Fane (1817–1868), British soldier and politician, MP for Hampshire South
Sir Henry Fane (British Army officer) (1778–1840), general and MP for Lyme Regis, for Sandwich, and for Hastings
Henry Sutton Fane, MP for Lyme Regis